Fred Smith (born March 27, 1942 in Raleigh, NC) is a North Carolina politician who served in the North Carolina Senate and ran for Governor of North Carolina in 2008.

Early life and education
Smith was raised in Raleigh, North Carolina.  His father was a teacher and coach at an orphanage, and his mother was a homemaker. While attending Raleigh's Needham B. Broughton High School, Smith earned a football scholarship to attend Wake Forest University. Subsequently, he attended Wake Forest University School of Law, where he graduated with honors in 1966.

Smith is married to Virginia Reid Smith, is father to five children, and is grandfather to seven children. The Smith family is active in the First Baptist Church of Clayton, where he has been a Sunday school teacher.

Military and business career
Smith served as a captain in the United States Army JAG Corps for four years after law school. In the years that followed, Fred Smith became a lawyer and homebuilder. Smith's businesses employ more than 600 people in Wake and Johnston Counties.  The largest of those companies is paving company CC Mangum, of which he is the CEO.  Smith also created the Fred Smith Company, which builds homes and constructs golf courses and athletic clubs.  Smith touts himself as a CEO, not a politician, who deals with "straight talk and a clear vision."

Political career
Smith was elected in 2000 as a Johnston County commissioner. In 2002, he was elected to the first of 3 terms in the state Senate, representing Johnston County and Wayne County.

Smith argued for a critical east-west transportation corridor. He was a primary sponsor of North Carolina Amendment 1, an amendment to the Constitution of North Carolina which would define marriage as between one man and one woman.

Smith was heavily criticized by the Democratic Party, including criticisms from then-state party chairman Jerry Meek, as being an absentee Senator, because Smith missed over 300 votes in 2007, which was over a quarter of all possible voting opportunities.

In 2007, Smith became a candidate for Governor. The office was coming open as a result of the departure of term-limited incumbent, Mike Easley. During his gubernatorial campaign, Smith physically visited all 100 North Carolina counties in nine months and 18 days, holding a barbecue dinner in each county. Barbecue dinners, known as the "Fred Smith for Governor BBQ Statewide Tour," started in Haywood County, North Carolina on Thursday, August 2, 2007, and ended on Tuesday, March 18, 2008 in Pasquotank County, North Carolina. Additionally, during these dinners, Smith thanked each attendee upon their exit from the dinner.

Smith lost the 2008 Republican primary to Charlotte Mayor Pat McCrory. Official primary election results show Fred Smith won 66 counties but out of a total of 504,973 votes, Smith lost the popular vote to Pat McCrory by 45,975 votes.

On May 6, 2008, Smith endorsed Pat McCrory, saying, "I have pledged my full support to Pat McCrory to do whatever is in my power to help elect a Republican governor in November to change the culture in Raleigh and fix our broken government." McCrory was not elected in 2008, but was elected in 2012. After taking office in 2013, McCrory appointed Smith to the North Carolina Economic Development Board.

References

External links
 News & Observer profile
 County NC News
 North Carolina State Board of Elections

Living people
1942 births
21st-century American politicians
Needham B. Broughton High School alumni
Republican Party North Carolina state senators
United States Army officers
Wake Forest Demon Deacons football players
Wake Forest University School of Law alumni